Stoke Ferry is a closed railway station in Norfolk. It was the terminus of a 7¼ mile branch line from Denver which opened on 1 August 1882 and finally closed to all traffic in 1965.

History
The Downham and Stoke Ferry Railway opened on 1 August 1882, and Stoke Ferry station opened with the line.

Bradshaw's Railway Guide 1922 shows a service of 4 trains a day on weekdays only between Stoke Ferry and Downham on the Great Eastern Railway's Cambridge to King's Lynn line.

The village of Stoke Ferry lies on the River Wissey and the station was on the southern edge of the village.

The station closed to passengers on 22 September 1930.

Routes

See also 
 List of closed railway stations in Norfolk
 Ryston
 Abbey and West Dereham

Notes

References

External links
 Stoke Ferry station on navigable 1946 O. S. map

Former Great Eastern Railway stations
Disused railway stations in Norfolk
Railway stations in Great Britain opened in 1882
Railway stations in Great Britain closed in 1930
Stoke Ferry